Sony released the following SEL (for: Sony E-mount Lens) lenses for Sony E-mount cameras since 2010. They are also compatible with Hasselblad E-mount cameras. Some of the lenses introduced into the line have been developed in cooperation with Carl Zeiss (as indicated).

List of Sony E-mount APS-C zoom lenses

List of Sony E-mount APS-C prime lenses

List of Sony E-mount full frame zoom lenses

List of Sony E-mount full frame prime lenses

List of Sony E-mount lens accessories 

Key:

See also
 List of third-party E-mount lenses
 List of Minolta A-mount lenses
 Zeiss Planar
 Zeiss Sonnar
 
 Zeiss Vario-Tessar

References